Serhiy Anatoliyovych Minko (born September 20, 1973, Pavlodar, Kazakh SSR, USSR) is a Ukrainian politician, businessman, public figure and philanthropist who served as Mayor of Melitopol from 2015 to 2019. He previously served as Secretary of the Melitopol City Council and Acting Mayor in 2014–2015. People's Deputy of Ukraine of the IX convocation.

Biography 
He was born on September 20, 1973 in Pavlodar of the Kazakh SSR.

Mayor of Melitopol 
On October 1, 2015, he was registered as a candidate for mayor of Melitopol from the Bloc of Petro Poroshenko party "Solidarity". He won the first and second rounds of local elections.

On November 20, 2015, he took the oath of the mayor and began to perform his duties.

People's Deputy 
In the early 2019 Ukrainian parliamentary election, Minko nominated his own candidate in the constituency № 80 (the city of Melitopol and the Melitopol district). He won with 39.13% of voter support. In parliament he joined the deputy group "For the Future".

Secretary of the Verkhovna Rada Committee on Law Enforcement.

References 

Living people
1973 births
Mayors of Melitopol
21st-century Ukrainian businesspeople
Ninth convocation members of the Verkhovna Rada
People from Pavlodar